Wilmot is a neighbourhood in the Southeastern part of the Canadian city of Summerside, Prince Edward Island. 

Wilmot is the home to one of Prince Edward Island's ADL Food plant, and other homes and parks like LeFurgey park.

References 

Former community municipalities in Prince Edward Island
Neighbourhoods in Summerside, Prince Edward Island